A dependent territory, dependent area, or dependency is a territory that does not possess full political independence or sovereignty as a sovereign state, yet remains politically outside the controlling state's integral area. Most use the currency of their administrating country; this List of currencies used in dependent territory details their use of currency. Most of these banknotes are pledged with their parent currencies (i.e. Gibraltar pound is pledged with Pound Starling).

List of currencies used in dependent territory

References 

Currencies by country